Kenneth Sørensen (born 14 March 1982) is a Danish footballer who has since retired.

Sørensen has made only a few league appearances for AC Horsens, since he joined the club from Holbæk B&I in the summer of 2006, and he is yet to score his first league goal for the club. He has also represented HB Køge. He announced his retirement on January 1, 2017.

References

External links

Living people
1982 births
AC Horsens players
Herfølge Boldklub players
HB Køge players
Danish Superliga players
Association football midfielders
Danish men's footballers
Vendsyssel FF players
Holbæk B&I players
Brønshøj Boldklub players